Hilaria Ndiiwana Mukapuli (born  4 April 1969) is a Namibian politician and a legislator in the Parliament of Namibia, as Member of National Assembly serving the 2020-2025 term, representing SWAPO Party of Namibia. Mukapuli also served as a Mayor of Lüderitz  from 2016- 2019.

Education and Early career 
Hilaria Ndiiwana was born in Lüderitz  where she attained her primary education at Diaz Primary school.  She also attend school at Andimba Toivo Ya Toivo Secondary School formerly known as Oluno Secondary School and Nangolo Secondary School. In her early career,  Hilaria  worked in various capacities such as a fish processor at NovaNam, a manager the family's business, a community counselor and HIV rapid tester at the Ministry of Health and Social Services, and a community social worker for an NGO where she provided counseling and psychological support to a variety of people, including mothers who were HIV-positive and paid for vulnerable children's school expenses.

Political Career 
In 2010, Mukapuli  was elected as councilor in the Lüderitz local authority council.  In 2013, she was elected to serve as the district coordinator for the Swapo Party in Lüderitz. Hilaria in 2015 was elected as a mayor of  Lüderitz and served at that position until 2019.  She had high goals of affordable houses for everyone and improve sanitation for informal settlements and work towards a sustainable environment. As a Mayor she had been a strong advocate for substances abuse among school children and youth.  After 2019 general election, Mukapuli was elected to serve as member Parliament in the National Assembly.

References 

Living people
Women members of the National Assembly (Namibia)
Members of the National Assembly (Namibia)
1969 births
SWAPO politicians
People from Lüderitz